Staphyleaceae is a small family of flowering plants in the order Crossosomatales, native to Europe, temperate and tropical Asia and the Americas.  The largest genus Staphylea, which gives the family its name, contains the "bladdernut" trees. The family includes three genera with more than 40 known species.

Genera
Plants of the World Online currently includes:
 Dalrympelea Roxb.
 Staphylea L. (includes Euscaphis)
 Turpinia Vent.

Excluded genera
These two genera, formerly placed here, are now included in the Tapisciaceae (Huerteales) as of the APG III system (2009).
Huertea
Tapiscia

References

 
Rosid families